Sisonke may refer to:

 Sisonke Protocol, Phase 3 COVID-19 vaccine trial in South Africa, with over 50,000 people
 Harry Gwala District Municipality, district in KwaZulu-Natal, South Africa